The Schnidehorn is a mountain of the Bernese Alps, located on the border between the Swiss cantons of Bern and Valais. It lies in the massif of the Wildhorn, west of the Rawil Pass. A ridge connects the Schnidehorn and the Wildhorn to the southwest, via the Schnidejoch.

References

External links
 Schnidehorn on Hikr

Mountains of the Alps
Mountains of Switzerland
Mountains of the canton of Bern
Mountains of Valais
Bern–Valais border
Two-thousanders of Switzerland